is a city located in Ibaraki Prefecture, Japan. , the city had an estimated population of 138,033 in 60,069 households and a population density of 1123 persons per km2. The percentage of the population aged over 65 was 29.7%. About 3,000 residents are non-Japanese, a large proportion of which are Filipinos, Chinese, and Brazilians.

Geography
Located in southwestern Ibaraki Prefecture, Tsuchiura is situated along the western shores of Lake Kasumigaura, the second largest lake in Japan. The Tokyo metropolis lies about 60 km to the south, and Tsukuba science city borders Tsuchiura to the west.

Surrounding municipalities
Ibaraki Prefecture
 Ushiku
 Tsukuba
 Kasumigaura
 Ishioka
 Ami

Climate
Tsuchiura has a Humid continental climate (Köppen Cfa) characterized by warm summers and cool winters with light snowfall.  The average annual temperature in Tsuchiura is 13.9 °C. The average annual rainfall is 1286 mm with September as the wettest month. The temperatures are highest on average in August, at around 25.8 °C, and lowest in January, at around 2.8 °C.

Demographics
Per Japanese census data, the population of Tsuchiura has recently plateaued after a long period of growth.

History

Premodern era
Human settlement in the Tsuchiura area dates to the Japanese Paleolithic period. Hunter-gatherers inhabited the coastal area of the Pacific Ocean (now Lake Kasumigaura) forming large shell middens, examples of which can be seen at the Kamitakatsu archeological site. Locals began wet-rice cultivation and development of iron and bronze technology during the Yayoi period and in the Kofun period numerous Burial mounds were constructed in the area. During the Nara period the area was organized under the Taihō Code with what is now Tsuchiura occupying four districts of Hitachi Province. In 939, during the Heian period, Taira no Masakado lead an uprising against the central government by attacking the provincial capital at Ishioka, a few kilometers to the north of Tsuchiura. During the Kamakura period and the Sengoku period, the area was dominated by several samurai clans. During the Edo period, part of what is now Tsuchiura was administered as a castle town by Tsuchiura Domain, one of the feudal domains of the Tokugawa shogunate. The area prospered due to its position on the Mito Kaidō, a highway connecting Edo with Mito and with a canal connecting Lake Kasumigaura to Edo Bay.

Modern period
With the creation of the modern municipalities system after the Meiji Restoration on April 1, 1889, the town of Tsuchiura was established within Ibaraki Prefecture. In 1895 railroad service was started in Tsuchiura. The Gothic Revival architecture of the old junior high school from this period can be seen at the Daiichi high school.

Tsuchiura was elevated to city status when the towns of Manabe and Tsuchiura were merged on November 3, 1940. The city suffered damage during an air raid on June 10, 1945 during World War II. 
On September 1, 1951, Tsuchiura absorbed parts of the village of Asahi (on the shores of Arakawa) and absorbed the village of Towa. The city later absorbed the village of Kamiotsu on November 1, 1954. On February 20, 2006, the village of Niihari (from Niihari District) was merged into Tsuchiura.

Government
The city is managed by the mayor's office and the city council, essentially a mayor-council government. The mayor is elected through a citywide election and the city council are elected from their respective districts. The mayor's office is made up of the Mayor, Kiyoshi Nakagawa (中川清), and Vice mayors, Hideaki Goto (五頭英明) and Hiroshi Koizumi (小泉祐司). The 28-member city council is headed by Chairperson Kiyoshi Yaguchi (矢口清). Tsuchiura's political system is similar to other cities in Japan, as the Local Autonomy Law makes all municipalities uniform in terms of power and organization. Tsuchiura contributes three members to the Ibaraki Prefectural Assembly. In terms of national politics, the city is part of Ibaraki 6th district of the lower house of the Diet of Japan.

Economy
Tsuchiura was formerly the center of commerce in southern Ibaraki Prefecture due to its good rail connections and location on Lake Kasumigaura. It was also the location of a major base of the Imperial Japanese Navy Air Corps both before and during the war. In the postwar era, the development of the Japanese national highway system, selection of neighboring Tsukuba as a center for government investment and development, and increasing suburbanization has resulted in the closure of many department stores and commercial facilities in the center of the city. The city has several industrial parks. Present land usage is over 30% agricultural, with lotus root as a famous local crop.

Education
Tsukuba International University
Tsuchiura has 16 public elementary schools and seven public middle schools operated by the city government, and five public high school operated by the Ibaraki Prefectural Board of Education. There are also one private elementary school,  one combined middle/high school and three private high schools. The prefecture also operates one special education school for the handicapped.

Transportation

Railway
 JR East – Jōban Line
 -  -

Highway
  – Sakura-Tsuchiura Interchange, Tsuchiura-Kita Interchange

Sister city relations
 – Palo Alto, California, USA, since 2009
 – Friedrichshafen, Germany, since 1994

Local attractions
site of Tsuchiura Castle
Tsuchiura National Fireworks Competition

Noted people
Kazuhiko Nishijima, physicist
Takeshi Terauchi, musician
Chiaki Kuriyama, actress
Haruma Miura, actor, singer
Mari Iijima, singer-songwriter
Junko Minagawa, voice actress
Nobuo Fujita, IJN aviator
Tomoko Fukumi, judoka
Takayasu Akira, sumo wrestler
Noriyuki Sugasawa, basketball player
Junichi Saga, local writer and medical doctor
Kasumi, gym leader

In popular media
Celurean City from the Japanese game series Pokémon is geographically placed in the real-world location of Tsuchiura City because of the lake nearby.

References

External links

 https://www.youtube.com/watch?v=CcgrIKoTqbo and https://www.imdb.com/title/tt11779894/?ref_=ttrel_rel_tt (documentary by director Chris Jiménez)
Official Website 

 
Cities in Ibaraki Prefecture